Europa (known as Zentropa in North America) is a 1991 experimental psychological drama film directed and co-written by Lars von Trier. The film is an international co-production between Denmark and five other European countries, it is von Trier's third theatrical feature film, and the third and final installment in his Europa trilogy, following The Element of Crime (1984) and Epidemic (1987).

The film features an international ensemble cast, including Germans Barbara Sukowa and Udo Kier, expatriate American Eddie Constantine, and Swedes Max von Sydow and Ernst-Hugo Järegård. This was German-born French-American Jean-Marc Barr's first collaboration of a series of films with von Trier.

Europa was influenced by Franz Kafka's Amerika, and the title was chosen "as an echo" of that novel. The music, including the main theme, was composed by von Trier's ex-brother-in-law and frequent collaborator Joachim Holbek, who also composed Riget (1991-2022) and Manderlay (2005).

Plot 
Set in the mid-1940s, whereas US-occupied Germany after the end of World War II, the entire population is under close surveillance. In this turbulent time, in an atmosphere saturated with fear and violence, the main events of the life of two completely different, but very close people unfold. A narrator (Max von Sydow) announces to the viewer that he will soon be waking up in Europe. The voice counts to ten and proclaims, "when you have counted to ten inwardly, you will be in Europe".

A young American with German descent, Leopold Kessler (Jean-Marc Barr), comes to Germany and gets a job as a train conductor of the railway company Zentropa with his uncle (Ernst-Hugo Järegård). Leopold only sees Germany from the perspective of moving trains, train stations or dormitories. As he tries unsuccessfully to conform to society's rules, he witnesses the country's inner turmoil and the aftermath of its recent past.

Before that, he falls in love with a young German woman, Katharina (Barbara Sukowa), the younger sister of Lawrence Hartmann (Udo Kier) and daughter of the Zentropa's founder Max Hartmann (Jørgen Reenberg), who secretly associated with a group of underground Nazi terrorist conspiracy Werwolf. She invites him to dinner at her half-bombed family mansion. With the help of a false testimony from a Jewish American (Lars von Trier), who claims he was the lifesaver, Max Hartmann receives a clean bill of health and is rehabilitated. Hartmann later commits suicide out of shame. Later, Leopold marries Katharina in the cathedral, but shortly thereafter she disappears without a trace.

One day, Werwolf group demands Leopold by giving several explosives that he blow up the train. Leopold makes the necessary preparations as ordered, but then discover Katharina, demands the same to him. He tries to tell an American officer about the bomb, but circumstances prevent him from doing so. At this time, Leopold's superiors are trying to test his professional suitability. In desperation, he plants the bomb and sets the clockwork. However, pity for the people makes Leopold turn off the explosives.

In the meantime, the occupation authorities uncover the Werwolf cell. Leopold sees Katharina in handcuffs. She convinces him that it was he who made her mistake, because there are no innocent people in Germany, since during the war years its citizens either killed or betrayed. Leopold is driven to despair, he stops the train to prevent them from leaving Germany, but they still aboard again, he decides to detonate the explosives. As a result, the train explodes on the bridge as intended, crashes into the river and eventually killed several people including his uncle and Katharina in a car, and Leopold did not make it in time after he was drowned in the sunken train car, floated out into the sea. It is later revealed the narrator appears, approaching the resurrection to Leopold's freedom from the image of Europa.

Cast

Style 

Europa employs an experimental style of cinema, combining largely black and white visuals with occasional intrusions of colour (which later inspired Steven Spielberg's 1993 Holocaust film Schindler's List), having actors interact with rear-projected footage, and layering different images over one another to surreal effect. The voice-over narration uses an unconventional second-person narrative imitative of a hypnotist.

The film's characters, music, dialogue, and plot are self-consciously melodramatic and ironically imitative of film noir conventions.

Morando Morandini writes: "More than the characters, what counts is the technical-formalistic apparatus: color contrasted with black and white, superimpositions, distorting lenses, dynamic camera, expressionistic-style set designs. Anti-German in substance, it is profoundly German in form".

Production 
The film was shot throughout Poland (Chojna Cathedral (Marienkirche) and the Chojna Roundhouse) and in Denmark (Nordisk Film studios, Copenhagen and the Copenhagen Dansk Hydraulisk Institut). The cathedral where the main characters are getting married is that of Chojna, whose roof was destroyed by the Soviet army during the war.

Von Trier's production company, Zentropa Entertainments, is named after the sinister railway network featured in this film, which is in turn named after the real-life train company Mitropa.

Reception 
Europa was released as Zentropa in North America to avoid confusion with Europa Europa (1990).

Critical reception 

The film received largely positive reviews from critics. Review aggregator website Rotten Tomatoes reports an 81% score based on 16 reviews, with an average rating of 7.3/10.

One of the members from Lexicon of International Film gave a positive review: "A straightforwardly told mixture of thriller and melodrama, which is based on the classic role models of the genres, but goes beyond the given limits due to its unusual visual creative will. At the same time, an attempt is made to use film as a means of mass suggestion. Worth seeing because of the optically sophisticated form".

Accolades 
The film won three awards at the 1991 Cannes Film Festival (Best Artistic Contribution, Jury Prize, and Technical Grand Prize). Upon realizing that he had not won the Palme d'Or, von Trier gave the judges the finger and stormed out of the venue.

Home media 
The Criterion Collection released the film on DVD in 2008. The package contained several documentaries on the film and an audio commentary by von Trier.

References

External links 
 
 
 
 
 
 Europa: Night Train an essay by Howard Hampton at the Criterion Collection

1990s avant-garde and experimental films
1991 drama films
1991 films
Best Danish Film Bodil Award winners
Best Danish Film Robert Award winners
British avant-garde and experimental films
British drama films
Danish avant-garde and experimental films
Danish drama films
English-language Danish films
1990s English-language films
Films about Nazis
Films directed by Lars von Trier
Films partially in color
Films set in 1945
Films set in 1946
Films set in Germany
Films shot in Denmark
Films shot in Poland
French avant-garde and experimental films
French drama films
English-language French films
German avant-garde and experimental films
German drama films
English-language German films
1990s German-language films
Polish avant-garde and experimental films
Polish drama films
English-language Polish films
Rail transport films
Swedish avant-garde and experimental films
Swedish drama films
English-language Swedish films
Swiss avant-garde and experimental films
Swiss drama films
English-language Swiss films
Films produced by Peter Aalbæk Jensen
1990s British films
1990s French films
1990s German films
1990s Swedish films
British psychological drama films
German psychological drama films
1990s psychological drama films
Anti-war films